14th SFFCC Awards
December 12, 2015

Picture: 
Spotlight

Animated Feature: 
Anomalisa

Documentary: 
Listen to Me Marlon

Foreign Language Picture: 
Son of Saul

The 14th San Francisco Film Critics Circle Awards, honoring the best in film for 2015, were given on December 12, 2015.

Winners

These are the nominees for the 14th SFFCC Awards. Winners are listed at the top of each list:

Special awards

Special Citation Award for under-appreciated independent cinema
 Guy Maddin – The Forbidden Room

Marlon Riggs Award for courage & vision in the Bay Area film community
 Lee Tung Foo (a.k.a. Frank Lee)

References

External links
 The San Francisco Film Critics Circle
 2015 San Francisco Film Critics Circle Awards

San Francisco Film Critics Circle Awards
2015 film awards
2015 in San Francisco